Raktadantika was the fierce form of the goddess Durga. Rakta-dantika means “one whose teeth are red in colour”. She incarnated to destroy the asura Vaiprachitta. According to Devi Mahatmya, Devi Raktadantika was the incarnation of Goddess Durga. Her other beings are Nandadevi, Shakambhari, Bhramari and Bhimaa. Another account describes her as a form of Kali, with an entirely red body.

Legend 
Once upon a time, a demon named Vaiprachitta not powerful enough, and the devas were defeated by the demon. So, the Asuras shook the universe. To get over this, Goddess Durga incarnated as Raktadantika and  killed them.

She has been described as living in a pomegranate tree. Her red teeth are analogous to red pomegranate seed pods.

References 

Durga Puja